Horror story is a genre of speculative fiction.

Horror Story or Horror Stories may also refer to:

Horror Story (film), 2013 Indian film
Horror Story (video game),  1989 run and gun arcade video game
Horror Stories (album), an album by the garage punk band Dwarves
Horror Stories (magazine), a pulp magazine
Horror Stories (film), 2012 South Korean film
Horror Stories 2, 2013 South Korean film 
Horror Stories 3, 2016 South Korean film 
Krvavý román, or Horror Story, 1993 Czech film

See also
American Horror Story